Truppach is a river of Bavaria, Germany. It is a left tributary of the Wiesent near Plankenfels.

References

See also
List of rivers of Bavaria

Rivers of Bavaria
Rivers of Germany